Jennette Jansen (born 17 April 1968, in Westerhaar) is a Paralympian from the Netherlands competing mainly in category TW4 wheelchair racing and later as a basketball player and cyclist. She competed at the 2020 Summer Paralympics, in Women's individual class 7, winning a gold medal, and in Women's road time trial H4–5 winning a bronze medal.

Biography
Jansen first appeared in the Paralympics in the Athletics events of the 1988 Seoul games, where she won three gold medals in athletics.  By the time of the Atlanta games in 1996 she was part of the Dutch team in wheelchair basketball that won the silver medal, she continued competing as part of the team in 2000 and 2004 but without any further medal success. She competed at the 2016 Summer Paralympics, where she won bronze in the  H5 road race.

References

External links
 Jennette Jansen – Paralympiër

1960s births
Living people
Paralympic athletes of the Netherlands
Dutch women's wheelchair basketball players
Paralympic wheelchair basketball players of the Netherlands
Dutch female wheelchair racers
Paralympic cyclists of the Netherlands
Dutch female cyclists
Paralympic gold medalists for the Netherlands
Paralympic silver medalists for the Netherlands
Paralympic bronze medalists for the Netherlands
Athletes (track and field) at the 1992 Summer Paralympics
Wheelchair basketball players at the 1996 Summer Paralympics
Wheelchair basketball players at the 2000 Summer Paralympics
Wheelchair basketball players at the 2004 Summer Paralympics
Cyclists at the 2016 Summer Paralympics
Cyclists at the 2020 Summer Paralympics
Medalists at the 1988 Summer Paralympics
Medalists at the 1992 Summer Paralympics
Medalists at the 1996 Summer Paralympics
Medalists at the 2016 Summer Paralympics
Medalists at the 2020 Summer Paralympics
People from Vriezenveen
Paralympic medalists in athletics (track and field)
Paralympic medalists in wheelchair basketball
Paralympic medalists in cycling
Sportspeople from Overijssel
20th-century Dutch women
21st-century Dutch women